Plano ISD Academy High School, commonly referred to as Academy High School, is a STEAM, interdisciplinary and project-based learning high school. The school serves students from grades 9-12. This school is not a regular secondary school because this school uses a selection process to draw eighth graders from various middle schools in Plano ISD. The school is an alternative to the regular high school experience by offering collaborative team projects, more STEAM classes and the ability to attend classes without structured class periods. This school is one of the three Academy Programs in Plano ISD. The others are the Plano ISD Health Sciences Academy and The IB World School at Plano East.

Campus
The building is a three-story, former office building that belonged to Bell South, and later, AT&T.

In the summer of 2013, the PISD renovated the building and turned the building into a creative learning school. The school is an open floor plan school with classrooms that are dubbed Learning Spaces. There are three science labs, a fabrication lab, three presentation rooms, library, and conference rooms. The school also contains two dedicated soundproof rooms for student and club use.

Curriculum
The Plano Academy was designed for experimental project learning and advanced studies. Because of the project-based learning, students are able to work independently or in a group with less teacher management. Students graduating by senior year are required to have at least one internship. As part of the curriculum, all students graduate with the same foundational coursework. There is 1:1 technology at the Academy, meaning every student is provided with a school-issued Chromebook. Some notable projects include developing and zoning a plan for the city of Plano, creating and managing a company with innovative products, designing a video game, and launching projectiles. In their senior year, students are required to make an in-depth and wide-reaching capstone project that spans the entire year.

Academics
The school offers the basic classes required to graduate in the state of Texas. It also offers optional classes: calculus, Spanish, French, and digital media. Seniors have the option to not take an art course to give more time towards their capstone. Unique types of classes called "project time" or "capstone time" are used to give students independent work times with teacher facilitation. Juniors and seniors can also take courses offered by Collin College that provide college and high school credit, similar to Advanced Placement.

Unique Terminology 
The Academy has adopted traditions of using unique terms to describe people and places in the school:
 Grade levels, rather than being called "freshman, sophomores, etc.," are referred to as "first-years, second-years, etc."
 Class periods are referred to as schedule blocks called "mods." Like college classes, these classes are also commonly called "seminars" and "lectures."
 Due to the unique space of the Academy, rather than calling each divided space a classroom, they are called "learning spaces."
 Students are commonly referred to as "learners."
 Teachers are referred as "facilitators." This is because they do more than teach, they facilitate learning.

History
The Academy Visioning Committee started designing the plan for the school in 2010. Texas Instruments and other companies endowed the new school. In 2013, PISD held a lottery to determine which students are able to attend. In the first year of Academy's opening, students were learning multiple classes combined into a single project. Student-led organizations and PTSA also hosted several fundraising and school events such as the Winter Social, and the paintball tournament. The Academy has also allowed visitors from around the Dallas community to see the school's learning environment. The Academy's first graduating class graduated in the spring of 2016.

Clubs
The Academy offers over 20 clubs. Most clubs meet during school time. NHS and student council meet after school each week as well. Clubs include journalism, film, motorsports, and many other interests.

Robotics Club
The Titan Robotics Club won the Rookie All-Star Award at the 2015 Dallas Regional FRC Competition. Team 5431 went on to Nationals in St. Louis, Missouri (from April 22–25, 2015) and made to Carver Field Quarterfinals.

Titan Robotics entered in the Lone Star and Dallas Regional FRC competition in 2016. Team 5431 went on to Nationals in St. Louis, Missouri (from April 22–25, 2016) and made to Carver Field Quarterfinals.

In 2017, Titan Robotics competed in the FIRST Steamworks competition, going to the Dallas and Brazos Valley regionals. They were wild-carded and went on to Nationals in Houston, Texas and made it to the Hopper field playoffs.

In 2018, Titan Robotics competed in the FIRST Power Up Competition. This year they went to Dallas and El Paso regionals.

For the 2019 Season, Titan Robotics competed in the FIRST Destination: Deep Space competition. During this year First in Texas Transitioned from a Regional model to a District model. After this change, they went to the Plano and Greenville district events. While at Plano the team was seeded first after the general play and ended up winning the overall event. In addition to this, the team won the Chairman's award and the safety award. After each event, they were able to acquire enough points to move onto the District Championship. After playing the qualification matches, the team was seeded 15th and was picked up by the 6th alliance captain. (Team 5414 - Pearadox) However, the team was knocked out of the tournament after the quarterfinals. This wasn't the end for Titan Robotics, the team was able to win the State Chairman's award. After competitive play and points for awards, the team had enough points to qualify for Nationals in Houston. They competed in the Galileo division. Once the team finished their qualification matches they had seeded 15th overall. They were picked up into the 4th alliance captain. (Team 3128 - Aluminum Narwhals) Titan Robotics was knocked out in the quarterfinals.

See also
 Plano ISD
 STEAM

Notes

External links
 
 Plano ISD Website
 2014 Caudill Award for Excellence in Building Restructuring

Plano Independent School District high schools
High schools in Plano, Texas